There are currently 44 active-duty four-star officers in the uniformed services of the United States: 17 in the Army, three in the Marine Corps, eight in the Navy, 11 in the Air Force, two in the Space Force, two in the Coast Guard, and one in the Public Health Service Commissioned Corps. Of the eight federal uniformed services, the NOAA Commissioned Officer Corps is the only service that does not have an established four-star position.

List of designated four-star positions

Department of Defense

Joint Chiefs of Staff

Unified combatant commands

Other joint positions

Department of the Army

United States Army

Department of the Navy

United States Marine Corps

United States Navy

Department of the Air Force

United States Air Force

United States Space Force

Department of Homeland Security

United States Coast Guard

Department of Health and Human Services

United States Public Health Service Commissioned Corps

Statutory limits

The U.S. Code explicitly limits the total number of four-star officers that may be on active duty at any given time. The total number of active-duty general or flag officers is capped at 218 for the Army, 149 for the Navy, 170 for the Air Force, 62 for the Marine Corps, and 21 for the Space Force. For the Army, Marine Corps, Navy and Air Force, no more than about 23% of each service's active-duty general or flag officers may have more than two stars, and statute sets the total number of four-star officers allowed in each service. This is set at eight four-star Army generals, six four-star Navy admirals, nine four-star Air Force generals, two four-star Marine generals, two four-star Space Force generals, and two four-star Coast Guard admirals.

Several of these slots are reserved by statute. For the Army and the Air Force, the chief of staff and the vice chief of staff for both services are all four-star generals; for the Navy, the chief and vice chief of naval operations are both four-star admirals; for the Marine Corps, the commandant and the assistant commandant are both four-star generals. For the Space Force, the chief of space operations is a four-star general. For the Coast Guard, the commandant and the vice commandant are both four-star admirals. The chief of the National Guard Bureau is a four-star general under reserve active duty in the Army or Air Force. And for the Public Health Service Commissioned Corps, the assistant secretary for health is a four-star admiral if they hold an active-duty appointment to the regular corps.

Exceptions
There are several exceptions to the limits allowing more than allotted four-star officers within the statute. The secretary of defense can designate no more than 19 additional four-star officers, who do not count against any service's general- or flag-officer limit, to serve in one of several joint positions. A four-star officer serving as chairman or vice chairman of the Joint Chiefs of Staff does not count against his or her service's general- or flag-officer cap. These joint positions include the commander of a unified combatant command, the commander of U.S. Forces Korea, and the chief of the National Guard Bureau. Officers serving in certain intelligence positions are not counted against statutory limit, including the director of the Central Intelligence Agency. Finally, all statutory limits may be waived at the President's discretion during time of war or national emergency.

Appointment

Four-star grades go hand-in-hand with the positions of office they are linked to, so these ranks are temporary. Officers may only achieve four-star grade if they are appointed to positions of office that require and/or allow the officer to hold such a rank. Their rank expires with the expiration of their term of office, which is usually set by statute. Four-star officers are nominated for appointment by the president from any eligible officers holding a one-star grade or above, who also meets the other requirements for the position, under the advice and/or suggestion of their respective executive department secretary, service secretary, and if applicable the joint chiefs. The nominee must be confirmed via majority by the Senate before the appointee can take office and thus assume the rank. The Senate (normally in committee) may hold hearings to consider any nominee for appointment or reappointment to four-star grade, but usually only convene for nominations of the chairman of the Joint Chiefs of Staff, vice chairman, service chiefs, unified combatant commanders, and the commander of U.S. Forces Korea.

It is extremely unusual for a four-star nominee to draw even token opposition in a Senate vote, either in committee or on the floor, because the administration usually withdraws or declines to submit nominations that draw controversy before or during the confirmation process.

For example, upon encountering opposition in the Senate, the administration declined to submit nominations for General Joseph W. Ralston to be chairman of the Joint Chiefs of Staff in 1997.
Lieutenant General Ricardo S. Sanchez was once the leading candidate to become commander of U.S. Southern Command in 2004. However, his name was never formally offered after members of the Senate Armed Services Committee took notice of his mismanagement of the Iraq War and the Abu Ghraib prison affair.
General David L. Goldfein was the leading candidate to replace General Joseph Dunford as chairman of the Joint Chiefs of Staff in 2019, however due to disagreements between the secretary of defense and the president, the president disregarded the recommendation.
The President withdrew the nomination of General Alexander Haig to be the Army chief of staff in 1974, due to controversy regarding his role as the White House Chief of Staff at the peak of the Watergate scandal which caused the nomination to stall in the Senate.
General Peter Pace would have faced tough scrutiny from the Senate over the wars in Iraq and Afghanistan had he been nominated for reappointment as chairman of the Joint Chiefs of Staff in 2007.
 The President withdrew the nominations of Admiral Stanley R. Arthur to be commander in chief of U.S. Pacific Command in 1994, and of General Gregory S. Martin to be commander of U.S. Pacific Command in 2004 over their handling of the Tailhook and Darleen Druyun scandals respectively.

When a doomed nomination is not withdrawn, the Senate typically does not hold a vote to reject the candidate, but instead allows the nomination to expire without action at the end of the legislative session.

For example, the Senate declined to schedule a vote for the nomination of Lieutenant General James A. Abrahamson to be elevated to four-star rank as director of the Strategic Defense Initiative Organization in 1986.
The Senate also declined to vote on Lieutenant General Charles W. Bagnal's nomination for four-star rank and as commanding general of U.S. Army Pacific in 1989.
Major General John D. Lavelle was nominated to be posthumously restored to four-star rank on the retired list in 2010, but the nomination also expired in the Senate without action.
And Rear Admiral Cristina V. Beato was nominated to be assistant secretary for health in 2003 but her nomination also was not placed on the Senate schedule for a vote. Had Beato been confirmed and assumed office, she would have been the first woman in any uniformed service to achieve four-star grade; instead that honor went to General Ann E. Dunwoody.

Additionally, events that take place after confirmation may still delay or even prevent the nominee from assuming office, necessitating that another nominee be selected and considered by the Senate.

For example, Admiral William F. Moran was confirmed in May 2019 to be the chief of naval operations, but abruptly retired due to an investigation into his correspondence with a former subordinate accused of sexual harassment and usage of his personal email for military purposes. Consequently, Vice Admiral Michael M. Gilday was nominated for promotion to admiral and appointment as CNO, for which he was confirmed and assumed office in August 2019.

Command elevation and reduction

Any billet in the armed forces may be designated as a position of importance requiring the holder of the position to be of three-star or four-star rank. One-star and two-star billets may be elevated to three-star or four-star level as appropriate, either by act of Congress, or within statutory limits by the services at their discretion. Congress may propose such elevations or reductions to the President and U.S. Department of Defense. Due to the limited number of four-star slots available, significant changes occur on average every four to five years.

The existing commander of a lower-level command or office elevated to four-star rank can be appointed to grade in their present position, reassigned to another office of equal grade, or face retirement if another nominee is selected as their relief.

For example, Lieutenant General Christopher G. Cavoli, commanding general of U.S. Army Europe, was nominated for promotion to general in 2020 in concert with the consolidation of his command and U.S. Army Africa into U.S. Army Europe and Africa. He was promoted on 1 October 2020 and assumed command of the consolidated USAREUR-AF on 20 November 2020.
Lieutenant General Francis J. Wiercinski could have been nominated for promotion to general as U.S. Army Pacific transitioned to a four-star command, since as of May 2013, he had more than 200 days remaining on his customary three-year tour. Lieutenant General Vincent K. Brooks was instead nominated for promotion, and Wiercinski retired on 4 June 2013.

A lower level billet may be elevated to four-star grade, in accordance to being designated as a position of importance, to highlight importance to the defense apparatus as a whole or achieve parity with equivalent commands in the same area of responsibility or service branch.

For example, the statutory rank of the vice commandant of the Coast Guard was raised to admiral by the Coast Guard Authorization Act of 2015, to align the leadership structure of the Coast Guard to that of the other armed services and recognize the important role of the vice commandant at the national level. The incumbent vice commandant, Vice Admiral Charles D. Michel, was confirmed for promotion to admiral, and assumed the rank on 1 June 2016.
The statutory rank of the chief of the National Guard Bureau was raised to general by the National Defense Authorization Act of 2008, with significant congressional support. Lieutenant General Craig R. McKinley, then director of the Air National Guard, was confirmed for promotion to general, and assumed the rank and accompanying office on 17 November 2008.

Tour length

The standard tour length for most four-star positions is three years, bundled as a two-year term plus a one-year extension, with the following exceptions:

The chairman and vice chairman of the Joint Chiefs of Staff serve for a nominal four-year term.
Service chiefs of staff serve a nominal four-year term.
The chief of the National Guard Bureau serves a nominal four-year term.
The director of Naval Nuclear Propulsion serves for a nominal eight-year term.

All appointees serve at the pleasure of the president. Extensions of the standard tour length can be approved, within statutory limits, by their respective service secretaries, the secretary of defense, the president, and/or Congress but these are rare, as they block other officers from being promoted. Some statutory limits of tour length under the U.S. Code can be waived in times of national emergency or war. Four-star ranks may also be given by act of Congress but this is extremely rare.

Retirement

Other than voluntary retirement, statute sets a number of mandates for retirement. Regular four-star officers must retire after 40 years of active commissioned service unless reappointed to grade to serve longer. Reserve four-star officers must retire after five years in grade or 40 years of commissioned service, whichever is later, unless reappointed to grade to serve longer. Otherwise all general and flag officers must retire the month after their 64th birthday. However, the secretary of defense can defer a four-star officer's retirement until the officer's 66th birthday and the president can defer it until the officer's 68th birthday. Officers that served several years in the enlisted ranks prior to receiving their commission typically don't make it to the 40 years of commissioned service mark, because they are still subject to the age restrictions for retirement.

For example, Admiral Michael G. Mullen was born on 4 October 1946; placed on active duty in 1968 and promoted to admiral on 23 August 2003. Ordinarily, he would have been expected to retire at the end of his four-year term as chief of naval operations in 2008 after 40 years of service. Instead, he was reappointed as an admiral and appointed as chairman of the Joint Chiefs of Staff on 1 October 2007. He retired from the Navy after serving two, two-year terms as chairman on 1 October 2011, at the age of 65 with 43 years of service and eight years in grade.
General James F. Amos was born on 12 November 1946; placed on active duty in 1970 and promoted to general on 3 July 2008. Ordinarily, he would have been expected to retire at the end of his two-year term as assistant commandant of the Marine Corps in 2010 after 40 years of service. Instead, he was reappointed as a general and appointed as commandant of the Marine Corps on 22 October 2010. He retired from the Marine Corps after completing his four-year term as commandant on 17 October 2014, at the age of 67 with 44 years of service and six years in grade.
General Frank J. Grass was born on 19 May 1951; enlisted in the Missouri Army National Guard in October 1969 and received his commission in 1981. He was appointed as a general in the active duty reserves and assigned as chief of the National Guard Bureau on 7 September 2012. He remained on reserve active duty until he completed his four-year term as chief and retired from the Army on 3 August 2016, at 65 years of age with 35 years in commissioned service, 47 years of total service, and four years in grade.

Senior officers typically retire well in advance of the statutory age and service limits, so as not to impede the upward career mobility of their juniors. Since there are a finite number of four-star slots available to each service, typically one officer must leave office before another can be promoted. Maintaining a four-star rank is like a game of musical chairs; once an officer vacates a position bearing that rank, he or she has no more than 60 days to be appointed or reappointed to a position of equal or greater importance before he or she is expected to retire. Historically, officers leaving four-star positions were allowed to revert to their permanent two-star ranks to mark time in lesser jobs until statutory retirement, but now such officers are expected to retire immediately to avoid obstructing the promotion flow.

For example, Vice Admiral Patrick M. Walsh was promoted to admiral and appointed as vice chief of naval operations in 2007. The incumbent vice chief, Admiral Robert F. Willard, was appointed as commander of the U.S. Pacific Fleet. The incumbent Pacific Fleet commander, Admiral Gary Roughead, was appointed as commander of U.S. Fleet Forces Command, whose incumbent commander, Admiral John B. Nathman, received no further appointment and retired at the age of 59, with 37 years of service and three years in grade.
Lieutenant General Gary L. North was promoted to general and appointed as commander of Pacific Air Forces in 2009. The incumbent Pacific Air Forces commander, General Carrol Chandler, was appointed as vice chief of staff of the Air Force, while the incumbent vice chief, General William M. Fraser III, was appointed as commander of Air Combat Command, whose incumbent commander, General John D. W. Corley, received no further appointment and retired at the age of 58, with 36 years of service and four years in grade.

To retire at four-star grade, an officer must accumulate at least three years of satisfactory active-duty service in that grade, as determined by the secretary of defense. The president and Congress must also receive certification by the secretary of defense that the retiree served satisfactorily in grade. The secretary of defense may reduce this requirement to two years, and the president may waive this requirement altogether, but only if the officer is not being investigated for misconduct. Four-star officers who do not meet the service-in-grade requirement will revert to the next highest grade in which they served satisfactorily for at least six months which is normally the three-star grade. Since three-star ranks are also temporary, if the retiree is also not certified by the secretary of defense or the president to retire as a three-star, the retiree will retire at the last permanent rank he or she satisfactorily held for six months. The retiree may also be subject to congressional approval by the Senate before the retiree can retire in grade. It is rare for a four-star officer not to be certified to retire in grade or for the Senate to seek final approval.

For example, when removed from office after less than the statutory time in grade, Generals Frederick F. Woerner and Stanley A. McChrystal were retired as full generals as certified by the President and were not subjected to senatorial confirmation.
Admirals Husband E. Kimmel and Richard C. Macke were not certified to retire at three-star or four-star rank, and retired as two-star rear admirals.
General Kevin P. Byrnes had over two years in grade but was being investigated for misconduct, and retired as a lieutenant general.
In 1972 General John D. Lavelle was relieved for misconduct and certified to retire as a lieutenant general, but was rejected by a Senate Armed Services Committee vote of 14 to 2 and retired as a major general; in 2010 he was nominated posthumously for advancement to general on the retired list based on newly declassified evidence, however as stated above, the Senate did not vote on the nomination and let it expire at the end of the Congressional session.

General Michael J. Dugan retired as a full general as certified by the President, but only after receiving approval from the Senate Armed Services Committee.
After achieving the statutory time in grade, Admirals Frank B. Kelso II and Henry H. Mauz Jr. were retired as full admirals, but only after going through a full senatorial confirmation vote of 54 to 43 and 92 to 6, respectively.

Four-star officers who are under investigation for misconduct typically are not allowed to retire until the investigation completes, so that the Secretary of Defense can decide whether to certify that their performance was satisfactory enough to retire in their highest grade.

For example, an investigation by the Department of Defense comptroller held Generals Roger A. Brady and Stephen R. Lorenz in their four-star commands for up to 13 months beyond their originally scheduled retirements.
 General William E. Ward relinquished his four-star command as scheduled, but remained on active duty in his permanent grade of major general pending an investigation by the Department of Defense inspector general, before being allowed to retire as a lieutenant general over a year after his original scheduled retirement.
Admiral Samuel J. Locklear was held in his four-star command for months beyond his original scheduled retirement by the Navy's Consolidated Disposition Authority, while under investigation for the Fat Leonard corruption scandal before being cleared of any wrongdoing.

Furthermore, retired four-star officers may still be subject to the Uniform Code of Military Justice and disciplinary action, including reduction in retirement rank, by the secretary of defense or the president if they are deemed to have served unsatisfactorily in rank, post-retirement.
General David H. Petraeus, who had retired from the Army as a four-star general on 31 August 2011, faced punitive action from the secretary of defense over four years past his retirement date for mishandling classified materials while serving as the commander of the International Security Assistance Force and U.S. Forces Afghanistan. He was allowed to retain his four-star rank in retirement with the recommendation of the secretary of the Army and strong support from ranking members of the Senate Armed Services Committee.
General Arthur Lichte, who had retired from the Air Force as a four-star general on 1 January 2010, received a letter of reprimand from the secretary of the Air Force for sexually assaulting a subordinate female officer on multiple occasions, over six years after his retirement date. The secretary of defense withdrew Lichte's certification of satisfactory service, and reduced his retirement rank to major general, which the Air Force determined was his last permanent rank he served in satisfactorily. Lichte could have faced charges under the Uniform Code of Military Justice, however since the allegations were not reported or investigated until over five years past when they occurred, the statute of limitations bars having charges being brought up for prosecution.

Four-star officers typically step down from their posts up to 60 days in advance of their official retirement dates. Officers retire on the first day of the month, so once a retirement month has been selected, the relief and retirement ceremonies are scheduled by counting backwards from that date by the number of days of accumulated leave remaining to the retiring officer. During this period, termed transition leave or terminal leave, the officer is considered to be awaiting retirement but still on active duty.

For example, General Michael Hagee was relieved as commandant of the Marine Corps on 13 November 2006, and held his retirement ceremony the same day, but remained on active duty until his official retirement date on 1 January 2007.

A statutory limit can be waived by the president with the consent of Congress if it serves national interest. However, this is extremely rare.
For example, the record for the longest tenure in any service is held by General Lewis B. Hershey who enlisted in the Indiana Army National Guard in 1911 at the age of 18. He was called up for federal active duty during World War I, receiving a commission in 1916, and subsequently transferred to the regular army at the end of the war. He served in active duty in the Army until the age of 80 before being involuntarily retired in 1973 after 62 years of continuous service.
Admiral Hyman G. Rickover is listed as serving for 63 years in the Navy from 1918 to 1982. However his service reflects a time when attending any military academy was considered active duty service due in part from World War I. In today's military rules and regulations, an officer who initially begins their career through a military academy does not begin their service until upon receiving their commission after graduation, even though they are subject to the Uniform Code of Military Justice while attending the academy.

See also
List of United States military leaders by rank
List of United States Army four-star generals
List of United States Marine Corps four-star generals
List of United States Navy four-star admirals
List of United States Air Force four-star generals
List of United States Space Force four-star generals
List of United States Coast Guard four-star admirals
List of United States Public Health Service Commissioned Corps four-star admirals
List of active duty United States three-star officers
List of active duty United States Army major generals
List of active duty United States Marine Corps major generals
List of active duty United States rear admirals
List of active duty United States Air Force major generals
List of active duty United States Space Force general officers
List of current United States National Guard major generals
List of active duty United States senior enlisted leaders and advisors
Staff (military)

Notes

References

Four-star
Four-star officers
United S
United States four-star officers